Heritage Academy may refer to:

United States
Heritage Academy Longmeadow, Massachusetts
Heritage Academy in Arizona:
Heritage Academy (Laveen, Arizona), part of the Canyon Athletic Association
Heritage Academy (Mesa, Arizona)
Heritage Academy (Queen Creek, Arizona), Queen Creek, Arizona
Heritage Academy, Hagerstown, Maryland
Heritage Academy, Minneapolis Public Schools, Minnesota
Heritage Academy (Mississippi), Columbus, Mississippi
Heritage Academy (Columbia, Missouri), Columbia, Missouri
Heritage Academy, Hilton Head Island, South Carolina

Elsewhere
Heritage Academy (Pietermaritzburg), KwaZulu-Natal, South Africa
The Heritage Academy, Kolkata, India
Heritage Academy, Modinagar, Uttar Pradesh, India

See also
 Christian Heritage Academy, Del City, Oklahoma
 Christian Heritage Academy (Northfield, Illinois)
 National Heritage Academies, a for-profit charter school organization
 Heritage (disambiguation)
 Heritage School (disambiguation)
 Heritage High School (disambiguation)
 Heritage College (disambiguation)